Cyanoptila is a genus of passerine birds in the Old World flycatcher family Muscicapidae. 
It contains the following species:

 Blue-and-white flycatcher (Cyanoptila cyanomelana)
 Zappey's flycatcher (Cyanoptila cumatilis)

References

 
Taxa named by Edward Blyth